Lili Diamonds is an Israeli manufacturer of straight-edged diamonds.

Lili Diamonds was established by Siman-Tov brothers in 1981. The company owns globally registered patents for diamond cuts they developed, such as Meteor Cut®, Crisscut®, Crisscut® Cushion and Wondercut®. In addition, the company manufactures traditionally cut diamonds (i.e.Princess Cut, Emerald Cut, Square Emerald Cut and Cushion Cut).

The company's head office is located in Israel, with affiliates based in New York and Hong Kong. Lili Diamonds operates a polishing workshop in Israel employing over 100 craftsmen.

See also
Israeli diamond industry

References

Diamond Net - Fink's Jewelers to Offer the 'Meteor Cut' by Lili Diamonds.

Lili Diamonds Debuts Proprietary Meteor Cut.

Diamond Net - Lili Diamonds to Hold Press Conference at JCK Vegas.

Diamondworld - Lili Diamonds - Crafting Precision.

External links
 Lili Diamonds Official Website
 Lili Jewelry Official Website

Companies established in 1981
Diamond dealers
Diamond cutting